Student athlete (or student–athlete) is a term used principally in the United States to describe students enrolled at postsecondary educational institutions, principally colleges and universities, but also at secondary schools, who participate in an organized competitive sport sponsored by that educational institution or school.  The term student-athlete was coined in 1964 by Walter Byers, the first executive director of the National Collegiate Athletic Association (NCAA). The term is also interchangeable with the synonymous term “varsity athlete”.

Description

Educational institutions in the United States offer athletic scholarships to potential students that excel in sports and meet specific educational achievement standards. Intermural athletics in general and athletic scholarships, in particular, are regulated by organizations such as the National Collegiate Athletic Association (NCAA) or the National Association of Intercollegiate Athletics (NAIA), which set minimum standards for member institutions that govern both the granting and use of athletic scholarships.

An athletic scholarship is a form of support for tuition, room, board, and related costs awarded to an individual based predominantly on ability in sport. Schools and student-athletes are subject to eligibility rules imposed by national or regional governing associations. Such requirements include maintaining at least a minimum grade point average. Student-athletes must be amateurs and may not participate in professional competition. Special treatment or incentives beyond the scope of the scholarships themselves are banned.  The scholarships generally include academic support such as tutoring and library services.

NCAA and NAIA limit the number of scholarships for players on college rosters.

Historical perspective
Competitive intermural sports were introduced in post-secondary education in the United States in the nineteenth century. The first popular collegiate sport was crew, but football began its reign as the leading collegiate sport in the late 1880s. As interest in football, so did injuries incurred in competition. The NCAA was born out of President Theodore Roosevelt's demand to reform college football.  
The relationship between educational institutions and sports has been controversial since the 1930s, with media coverage of sports generating significant revenue for schools in broadcast rights for school sports programs and increased enrollment resulting from athletic team success.  Concerns about the role of intercollegiate athletics in post-secondary education and the conflicting demands faced by student-athletes remain. Proposition 48.

Student athletes in high school
Many states have strict rules for student-athletes, such as minimum academic performance standards sports eligibility. California, for example, expects a "2.0" GPA or a "C" average in every class.
College athlete Eligibility Requirements for U.S. Colleges
The NCAA has developed prerequisites for potential collegiate athletes based on its division structure:

Division I Academic Eligibility
To receive an athletic scholarship during the first year of college, a student-athlete in high school must complete 16 core-course requirements in eight semesters while earning at least the minimum required grade-point average. The student-athlete must also earn SAT or ACT scores corresponding to the core course grade-point averages and test-score sliding scale. (For example, a 3.000 core-course grade-point average might require at least 620 in the SAT.)

Division II Academic Eligibility
Currently, to enroll in a Division II college and participate in athletics or receive an athletic scholarship during a student's first year, the student must graduate from high school and complete 16 core courses	with a 2.000 grade-point average or better in those courses and
earn a SAT score of 820 or an ACT sum score of 68.

Division III Academic Eligibility
No athletic scholarships are available at schools in Division III. Athletic budgets there are significantly lower and standards more straightforward. A student-athlete satisfying the admission requirements for a particular school is eligible to compete in their sport.

NCAA Eligibility Center
NCAA regulations govern amateur status, and prohibit student-athletes from accepting prize money or compensation or sports agent representation.    Prospective student-athletes at NCAA schools have their academic credentials and amateur status certified.

Athletic scholarships
In the United States, the eligibility of student-athletes to receive scholarships, and the terms of the scholarships themselves, are largely regulated by either the NCAA or NAIA. 

Athletes who wish to enroll in a Division I school, participate in a varsity sport, and receive scholarships support must be reviewed by the NCAA clearinghouse. The NCAA Eligibility Center certifies whether prospective college athletes are eligible to play sports at NCAA Division I or II institutions. It reviews the student-athlete's academic record, SAT or ACT scores, and amateur status to ensure conformity with NCAA rules. 
To be eligible for an athletic scholarship, students must meet four main NCAA requirements: 1. Graduate from high school; 2. Complete the required number of core high school courses; 3. Earn a specified minimum GPA on a 4.0 scale in required core academic courses; 4. Achieve a specified minimum SAT or ACT score.

Athletic scholarship challenges
Gaining access to athletic programs and athletic scholarships can be difficult.  Few high school athletes earn college scholarships, and only a small percentage of athletic scholarships cover a student's tuition, room, board, and related expenses.  Only about 2% of high school athletes earn an athletic scholarship to an NCAA university and, on average, these scholarships are far less than the average tuition. The student athletes must meet the NCAA eligibility standards, and failure to meet these standards and complete academic work can jeopardize the student athlete's ability to compete, receive scholarships, and graduate from the institution at which they are enrolled.

Student athlete pressures
Student-athletes face distinct challenges, including balancing athletic responsibilities with academic and social responsibilities; balancing athletic success or failure with emotional stability; balancing physical health and injury with the need to continue competing; balancing relationships with coaches, teammates, parents, and friends; and addressing the end of a college athletic career.
Student-athletes also face challenges relating to identity, with self-worth often hinging on athletic success.

Academic performance
The Student Athlete Performance Rating (SAPR)  and Academic Progress Rate (APR) are used to measure student-athlete academic performance. 

The Academic Progress Rate is an NCAA tool that measures the success of a program's athletes toward graduation. It takes into account academic eligibility and retention. Division I sports teams calculate their student-athletes APRs each academic year; it serves as a predictor of graduation success.

Title IX of the U.S. Education Amendments of 1972
Title IX of the Education Amendments of 1972, commonly known simply as Title IX, is a United States law enacted on June 23, 1972, that states: "No person in the United States shall, based on sex, be excluded from participation in, be denied the benefits of, or be subjected to discrimination under any education program or activity receiving Federal financial assistance." Title IX of the Education Amendments of 1972 was designed to balance the amount of money spent on men's and women's sports. The late Sen. Ted Kennedy took a serious interest in women's athletics and was a champion of Title IX.   "Over time, he played the leading role in keeping Title IX strong through the Senate, using his stature and his savvy to ensure that it remained strong protection for women in athletics," said Marcia Greenberger, co-president of the National Women's Law Center. "As his leadership in the Senate grew, his responsibility for ensuring that Title IX remained strong and enforced grew. He became the dominant force behind the Civil Rights Restoration Act of 1987, which virtually re-enacted Title IX after a devastating, narrow Supreme Court decision, which among other things, removed Title IX coverage from all intercollegiate athletics; in this country." Greenberger contends that Title IX might not have survived without Kennedy's guardianship, and thus the sports world as it is today might be vastly different. The increased opportunities for female athletes can be witnessed in college and high school athletics programs and, in turn, have helped spawn professional leagues and greater participation and success at the Olympic level.

Graduation rates for student athletes
United States federal law mandates that universities reveal their graduation rates to inform policymakers and constituencies about efforts to support educational attainment for students and athletes.  Revealing student-athlete graduation rates helps prospective student-athletes estimate the course load and amount of practice and game time that will occupy their schedules. Universities with more selective admission policies graduate both students and athletes at higher rates, though their athletes graduate at lower rates relative to their student cohorts.

All three levels of competition take a Graduation Success Rate; it analyzes the percentage of athletes who receive a degree from their school. The Graduation Success Rate is different from an ordinary graduation rate in that it fails to include athletes who have transferred from a given school (perhaps because of grades). 
At the Division I level, the most recent Graduation Success Rate measurement is 86 percent, which is the highest ever. This score is 15 percent better than the initial record in 1984. Overall, athletes graduated at a higher rate than their non-athletic peers. Graduation rates of athletes and non-athletes vary based on demographics.  
Division II uses the Academic Success Rate, which is different than the Graduation Success Rate used by the Division I level. The Academic Success Rate includes freshman athletes on a team who are not on an athletic scholarship. Division II athletes and Division II non-athletes perform at a relatively similar level.

Reason for higher graduation rates
The reason that student-athletes appear to have higher graduation rates is not clear. One answer may be that athletes stay on track due to tutors and other academic resources provided to them by their university. Student-athletes are reportedly often discouraged from taking more challenging courses.

Student athletes after college
98% of collegiate athletes do not move on to professional sports after college.  Many struggle. 

Administrators, teachers, counselors and others may accommodate academic cheating in an effort to ensure academic eligibility or to guarantee college admission. 
“Unfortunately, those high school/college athletes who have role status and popularity thrust on them may see little need to develop a wide repertoire of interpersonal skills or to augment their educational and vocational skills”. Ultimately this could lead to a lack of rationality when it comes to future goals and objectives.

Fewer than 4% of high school football and basketball players make the transition to the collegiate level, and fewer than 2% of that 4% continue into the professional ranks, making the prospects for continuing in competitive team athletics more an illusion than a realistic option. Despite these data, a significant number of high school athletes continue to view college sport as the minor league experience necessary for entry into professional sports.

Graduation rates compared
There is a noticeable difference in graduation rates between scholarship and non-scholarship athletes. The athletes who attend school on scholarship have typically fared worse than non-scholarship or partial-scholarship athletes in academic achievement.  The table of Demographic and Academic Information for Athletes and the General Student Population reveals that non-athlete students on average have higher GPA's than student athletes. The national average high school GPA for athletes was 2.99, while it was 3.31 for non-athletes. The national average college GPA for student athletes is 2.56 with a national graduation rate of 34.2%; non-athletes average GPAs are slightly higher at 2.74 with a national graduation rate of 46.8%.  Analysis of 10 years of graduation rates across all major athletic programs concludes that graduation rates alone are insufficient and misleading unless they account for the widely varying constituencies served by different universities.

Student athletes and NCAA compliance 
Educational institutions in the NCAA are required to comply with the NCAA's rules and regulations, at the risk of serious penalties.

See also
Academic All-America
College athletics
Youth sports
College athletics in the United States
U Sports
NCAA Division II
NCAA Division I
NCAA Division III

References

External links
 The Shame of College Sports - Taylor Branch, The Atlantic, September 07 2011
O'Shaughnessy, Lynn. "8 things you should know about sports scholarships". cbsnews.com. Accessed December 13 2017.

Student sport